Jamal K. Greene is an American legal scholar whose scholarship focuses on constitutional law. He is the Dwight Professor of Law at Columbia Law School. Greene is one of four co-chairs of Facebook's Oversight Board, a body that adjudicates Facebook's content moderation decisions.

Early life and education 
Greene was raised in Park Slope, Brooklyn, New York City. His mother, Brenda Greene, is an English professor at Medgar Evers College of the City University of New York, and his father is an administrator at Adelphi University. His brother is the rapper Talib Kweli. Greene attended Hunter College High School, where he was a center fielder for the school baseball team. He obtained an AB from Harvard College in 1999, where he was a sports writer for The Harvard Crimson. One of his last pieces for that publication reflected on his experience as a "black kid from Brooklyn" spending four years "in the Ivy bubble". 

After graduation, Greene worked at Sports Illustrated. He received a JD from Yale Law School in 2005 and clerked for Judge Guido Calabresi of the United States Court of Appeals for the Second Circuit, from 2005 to 2006, and for Justice John Paul Stevens of the Supreme Court of the United States, from 2006 to 2007.

Academic career 
In 2008, Greene joined the Columbia Law School faculty. In 2020, he was named to Facebook's Oversight Board, a novel legal entity established to provide precedential decisions regarding appeals from content decisions made by the company.

Writing 
Greene is the author of How Rights Went Wrong: Why Our Obsession With Rights Is Tearing America Apart (2021). The book argues that United States constitutional law inappropriately grants strong protection to a small set of constitutional rights, as opposed to more limited protection to a broader set of rights. He further argues that this approach has hardened positions and reduced the ability for those with differing views to compromise. The work praises proportionality review as an alternative to American constitutional adjudication.

His additional writings in articles and book chapters include: "Selling Originalism"; "Giving the Constitution to the Courts", a review of Keith E. Whittington's Political Foundations of Judicial Supremacy: The Presidency, The Supreme Court, and Constitutional Leadership in U.S. History; "Beyond Lawrence: Metaprivacy and Punishment"; "Lawrence and the Right to Metaprivacy"; "Divorcing Marriage from Procreation"; "Judging Partisan Gerrymanders Under the Elections Clause"; "Hands Off Policy: Equal Protection and the Contact Sports Exemption of Title IX"; and "Disappearing Dilemmas: Judicial Construction of Ethical Choice as Strategic Behavior in the Criminal Defense Context".

See also 
 List of law clerks of the Supreme Court of the United States (Seat 4)

References

External links 
 Jamal Greene at Columbia Law School
 
 

American legal scholars
Columbia Law School faculty
Facebook Oversight Board members
Harvard College alumni
Lawyers from Brooklyn
Living people
Scholars of constitutional law
Yale Law School alumni
Year of birth missing (living people)